A list of Bangladesh films released in 1979.

Releases

See also

 1979 in Bangladesh
 List of Bangladeshi films of 1980
 List of Bangladeshi films
 Cinema of Bangladesh

References

External links 
 Bangladeshi films on Internet Movie Database

Film
Bangladesh
 1979